The Women's tournament of volleyball at the 2013 Bolivarian Games in Trujillo, Peru begun on November 24 and ended on November 29. All games were held at the Coliseo Gran Chimu. The defending champions, Peru, won their  competitions´s sixth title.

Teams

Round-Robyn

|}

Match Results

|}

Final standings

All-Star team

Most Valuable Player

Best Opposite

Best Outside Hitters

Best Setter

Best Middle Blockers

Best Libero

Medalists

References

Events at the 2013 Bolivarian Games
2013 in volleyball
Volleyball at the Bolivarian Games